Chemosphere is a biweekly peer-reviewed scientific journal published since 1972 by Elsevier and covering environmental chemistry. Its co-editors-in-chief are Jacob de Boer (Vrije Universiteit Amsterdam) and Shane Snyder (University of Arizona). The journal has a 2020 impact factor of 7.086, and is ranked 30th out of 274 journals in the category "Environmental Sciences."

References

External link 

Elsevier academic journals
Chemistry journals
Publications established in 1972
Environmental chemistry
Biweekly journals